Party of One is an album by English singer-songwriter Nick Lowe. Produced by Dave Edmunds, it was released in 1990 by Reprise Records and reissued with altered cover art and two bonus tracks in 1995 by Upstart Records.

Party of One is one of only two Nick Lowe solo albums with no cover songs, as it is made up entirely of songs written or co-written by Lowe (the other album is 1982's Nick the Knife). One of the songs on Party of One, "All Men Are Liars," features a playful jab at Rick Astley and quotes from his 1987 song "Never Gonna Give You Up."

Track listing
All songs written by Nick Lowe except as noted.

Side one
"You Got the Look I Like"
"(I Want to Build a) Jumbo Ark"
"Gai-Gin Man"
"Who Was That Man?"
"What's Shakin' on the Hill"

Side two
"Shting-Shtang"
"All Men Are Liars"
"Rocky Road" (Lowe, Simon Kirke)
"Refrigerator White"
"I Don't Know Why You Keep Me On"
"Honeygun"

CD reissue bonus tracks
"You Stabbed Me in the Front"
"Rocket Coast"

Personnel
Nick Lowe – bass guitar, lead vocals
Jim Keltner – drums
Bill Kirchen – electric guitar
Paul Carrack – organ, piano
Austin de Lone – piano, acoustic guitar
Ry Cooder – electric guitar, mandolin
Dave Edmunds – electric guitar
Ray Brown – string bass on "What's Shakin' on the Hill"
Most of the above – backing vocals

References

External links
 

1990 albums
Nick Lowe albums
Albums produced by Dave Edmunds
Reprise Records albums